Killara High School is a coeducational public secondary school, located on Koola Avenue in East Killara, Sydney. Established in 1968, Killara High School is one of the highest performing comprehensive non-selective public schools in the state. The success of the school in the Higher School Certificate (HSC) and its reputation as a school with an extensive program of curriculum enrichment make the school highly desirable. Activities such as music, art, dance, drama, debating, sport and strong participation in the Duke of Edinburgh's Award Scheme are included in the co-curricular program. Enrolment rose 21% from 2002 to a population of 1400 students in 2009. It now has 1580 students (2016). Currently, accepted catchment areas include Roseville, Lindfield, East Lindfield, West Killara, Killara, East Killara, West Gordon and East Gordon.

History
Killara High began construction in 1968 and was completed in 1970. The school facilitated the growing demands of the community in the newly created East Killara. Most of the students who went to Killara in the first years were the eldest in their family, as those with older siblings went to their school, rather than the newly built Killara.

In the 1980s, Killara High purchased a house occupying a corner of the school area, which later became the language centre, commonly referred to as "The House". The House has since been demolished making way for a new block of classrooms.

Crest and motto
The name: "Killara, an Aboriginal word meaning permanent"

The castle: A permanent place, shelter and reassurance, a means of maintaining that which is worthy of preservation, a storehouse of knowledge

The key: It is a symbol of progression, which opens doors of learning. It is also an emblem of growth and development into adulthood

The escutcheon:  Provide protection, a pivoted keyhole cover

The motto: , symbolises preservation of the best of the past and continued development into the future

Principal

Dr Mark Carter, a local boy and former student of the school, was the principal from 2002 until 2013. He won the state school regional principal of the year award in 2005.
As a child, he attended Gordon East PS. In September 2013 he was promoted to Director, Public Schools with the Department of Education.
Deputy Principal Judith Paszek served as Acting Principal until April 2014.

In Term 2 2014, Jane Dennett was appointed as the new principal. She was previously a teacher in the HSIE Faculty at Killara, but had more recently served as Deputy Principal at Pennant Hills High School.

Campus

Killara High School is set on 3.8 hectares of prime bushland, half the area allocated to a typical high school in the region. The school comprises seven  blocks, (A, B, C, D, E, G and K) with the school canteen located in C block, and the library in E block. Each block contains around the same number of classrooms (12 to 18) as found at other North Shore public high schools. The school's Lion Library is named after North Sydney Technical High School's library. When NSTHS closed in 1969, the contents of their library formed the beginning of the new KHS collection.  Other facilities include the Kerrabee Centre, which comprises a large hall capable of seating more than 1000 people and a 250-seat performance theatre with state-of-the-art sound and lighting, a small oval named jubilee, four multi-purpose courts, a large quadrangle, and a small residential buildings called the house, which has since been demolished to build a new block (Block K). Koola Oval across the road is often used for sport and PE classes, and it can be used by students during some lunch breaks.

Capital works since 2003 have resulted in the installation of security fencing, and five COLAs (Covered Outdoor Learning Areas) built around the school, grounds enhancements, upgrades to science laboratories, classrooms and the construction of studios above the canteen. With enrollment rising at the school, the number of demountable classrooms increased from four to eighteen, with an extra two demountable bathroom blocks also put in. These demountable classrooms and bathrooms have been removed to enlarge jubilee oval. Following a period of intensive work by the school and its Parents & Citizens Association, money was allocated in the 2012 NSW Budget to construct a new building at the school. G block opened in 2014, containing specialist technology and art rooms, and a number of general learning spaces. This has reduced the number of demountable classrooms to six.

Curriculum

Achievements
The school has consistently ranked among the highest performers in the NSW Higher School Certificate. In 2015 14 Killara High School students were placed on the All Rounders List for achieving the top band (Band 6) in ten or more units of study. 32% of the cohort received an ATAR above 90. Killara High remains one of the highest performing public comprehensive high schools in the Sydney Morning Herald's ranking list. In 2015, Killara was ranked 55th in the HSC ranking list in NSW. In 2014 the school had been ranked 64th.

 
Killara High was the best-performing public comprehensive top non-selective government school in the state for years 2000–2007, 2009–2011, 2013–2015 and 2022 by HSC performance.

Faculties
Teaching at Killara High School is divided amongst 10 curriculum departments, each teaching a variety of related Board of Studies endorsed subjects. The departments are:

 English (including ESL and Drama)
 Mathematics
 Science
 Languages (LOTE) including Chinese, French, German, Hebrew and Japanese
 Human Society & its Environment (Green) including Commerce, Business Studies, Economics, Aboriginal Studies and Geography
 Human Society & its Environment (Blue) including History and Legal Studies
 Creative and Performing Arts (CAPA) including Music and Visual Arts
 Technological and Applied Studies, including Engineering Studies, Design & Technology, Industrial Technology, Food Technology, Textiles & Design and Hospitality
 Personal Development, Health and Physical Education (PDHPE)
 Computing Studies & IT

Curriculum enrichment activities

Sport
Students in Years 7 and 8 at Killara High participate in an integrated sport program coordinated and taught by PDHPE staff, and compete in a number of Sport Gala Days with other schools.

Senior students from Years 9 to 11 also participate in sport throughout the year. These years participate in the Ku-ring-gai Zone Secondary School Sports against other schools. This is known as grade sport, or students may choose a recreational sport. These events are held on Thursday afternoons

The School also holds various carnivals during the year this includes:
Swimming Carnival
Athletics Carnival
Cross Country Carnival

Students may also compete in the Combined High Schools (CHS) competition in various sports throughout the year

Specialist wellbeing programs and camps

Year 7 – Year 7 Orientation Camp with Year 11 Peer Support Leaders running the program "DOB" (Don't Obey Bullies) 
Year 8 – Resolution the Solution: a whole day program focusing on strategies for managing conflict
Year 9 – Year 9 Camp at Stanwell Tops: running the program Talking Tolerance, focusing on acceptance of difference, generalising and stereotyping 
Year 10 – It's Your Life and It's Your Training. This includes goal setting, motivation, skills development, personal defence, communication, student leadership training and peer support training. Year 10 also participate in work experience and service learning.
Year 11 – Jindabyne Camp, where the Crossroads program, focusing on personal challenges, teamwork, personal development, independence as well as discussions of issues related to drug and alcohol use is run.
The school is a participant in the Australian Government MindMatters program, which focuses on wellbeing and mental health.

Student leadership
Killara High School offers many opportunities for students to engage in leadership within the school. There are currently seven leadership groups in the school, with more than 115 students engaged in improving the school and providing opportunities for the students. These include:

The Arts Council – Students elected by peers to promote the Arts within the school.
The Sports Council – Students elected by peers to promote sporting activities within the school.
Light & Sound Team – A small number of students in Years 7 to 10 who provide technical support and design for assemblies & performances. The team is self-nominated. It is coordinated by Tim Collins in the CAPA faculty.
The Student Representative Council (SRC) – A peer-elected group of students from all years who liaise with teachers and the principal to represent their year group and help their school through by introducing new facilities (such as cooled bubblers and new seating) and improving old facilities. They also hold activities as mufti days and barbecues, as well as hosting a variety of pizza based polls on their website.
The Social Justice Committee (SJC) – A student body with representatives from all years elected to be the "conscience" of the school. They engage in awareness campaigns and charity fundraising. Recently, the committee has been involved in raising funds for The Leukaemia Foundation, by running The World's Greatest Shave (Raising nearly $20,000 in 2019), Canteen, a charity supporting children facing cancer by selling bandanas and The Salvation Army by collecting non perishable edible items from home groups for people who can't afford them. The SJC has raised awareness for causes such as International Women's Day, International Men's Day, and Earth Hour.
Prefects – A peer–elected group of Year 11 students who liaise with teachers and the principal as well as being involved in their signature charities such as the Red Cross Appeal and The Westmead Children's Hospital Teddy Bear's Picnic. Prefects represent the school at a number of events.
Student Leaders Council – Is a group comprising two representatives from each Council, and the School Captains, who chair the meetings. Its role is to organise the groups and provide a body for inter-council activities.

Student exchange
Many Killara High School Students in various Years participate in the Rotary Youth Exchange Australia, sending them to many parts of the world.

Enrichment and other
 Annual yearbook production: The Green Years magazine
 Creative and Performing Arts 
Chess Club
Debating
Duke of Edinburgh's Award Scheme
Public speaking
Law Society Mock Trial
Model United Nations Australia (MUNA)
Drawing Club
Textiles Club
TAG (Talk About God) Christian group
Shabbat Club, run by NSW Board of Jewish Education
Social Inc.
Coding Club

Staff 
As a large school, Killara High has a wide range of specialist executive staff. There are three Deputy Principals, who are supported by three Stage Head Teachers, who each look after a Stage or two academic years. There is also a Head Teacher Wellbeing, Head Teacher Administration, and Head Teacher Secondary Studies.

The school has a Careers Adviser and two teacher-librarians.

Killara High School is structured on a Home Group system, where each student is allocated to a Home Group teacher, who remains with them as they progress through to Year 12. The Home Groups were introduced as a way to ensure that every student had an ongoing connection with a teacher. Year 12 students have access to a staff mentor, chosen by themselves.

Parents and Citizens Association
Killara High School has an active Parents and Citizens Association that contributes to the life of the school and the opportunities that are offered to students. Meetings are scheduled for 7:00 pm on the third Wednesday of every month, except where this clashes with vacations or school activities.

Performing Arts Enrichment Program

Drama
A Drama Ensemble meets after school and performs a production for an audience.

Each year either a musical or a MADD (Music, Dance, Drama) Festival is produced. In 2014 High School Musical was produced and MADD will be a feature of Term 2 2016.

Dance
Killara High School's various dance groups have performed at the Sydney North Dance Festival, State Dance Festival, Schools Spectacular, MacDonald Performing Arts Challenge, Rock Eisteddfod and at the Opening and Closing Ceremonies of the Pacific School Games and Olympic Games.
Dance Groups
Intermediate Dance Group
Junior A Dance Group
Junior B Dance Group

Music
Concert Bands
Concert Bands One and Two
Stage Band
Stage Bands One and Two
String Ensemble
Orchestra
Choir

School traditions
There are four houses at Killara High School. These houses are named after Aboriginal words, since the area in which the school sits in Ku-ring-gai is steeped in Aboriginal tradition. The houses are:
Kimba (Fire): Red House
Caringa (Light): Yellow House
Mundara (Thunder): Green House
Doongara (Lightning): Blue House

There is also an honours system at Killara High School where students collect honour points from participating in extracurricular activities and completing excellent work in class.

The more points you earn the higher in the system you go, the ranks are as follows in ascending order:
Letter of Merit
Inscription in Honour Book
Honour badge
Honour Pennant can be attained from getting at least 4 Honour Badges
Honour Blue can be attained from gaining Honour Badges for all 6 years at Killara High School.
Each year Year 12 students are farewelled at a formal dinner with their families, called Ekuba. Traditionally, the Year 12 video, made by students, is a highlight of this evening.

An annual award ceremony is held to acknowledge the sporting and academic achievements of the students at the school.

Enrolment
Enrolment at Killara High School has, since 2002, increased 21 percent making it one of the three largest government schools in the State. Local enrolment in Year 7 now comprises 87 per cent of the cohort—up from 58 per cent in 2003—in an area with a number of excellent selective and private schools.

The school has an enrolment policy which involves an area-inclusive zone. Suburbs in the inclusive zone include Killara, East Killara, West Killara, Lindfield, East Lindfield, Gordon, West Gordon, East Gordon, and parts of Roseville. A detailed map of the local enrolment area and street names can be found on the school website.

Parents are also entitled to apply for enrolment of their children at Killara High School if they reside outside the designated local enrolment area but due to the high enrolment numbers, non-local enrolment is difficult as the school is currently at full capacity. The NSW Board of Jewish Education runs Hebrew classes at the school and the school accepts students out of the local enrolment area who have studied Hebrew prior to coming to the school.

Networks 
Killara High School belongs to the Killara Schools Partnership (KSP) and the North Shore 5 (NS5).

The KSP consists of KHS and its partner primary schools – Beaumont Road, Gordon East, Killara, Lindfield, Lindfield East and Roseville Public Schools. There is a very strong relationship between the schools, with many students participating in curriculum enrichment activities (STEM, HSIE, public speaking and debating, creative writing, technological studies, sport and creative and performing arts) within the network. Staff involvement in the Quality Teaching Rounds program is also a feature of the KSP. In 2015 a shared school development day was held at KHS, called Killara Connect. This teach meet-style event brought staff from all seven schools together to share programs.

The NS5 unites KHS with Chatswood, Ku-ring-gai, St Ives and Turramurra High Schools. A key feature of this network is the Collaboration and Innovation Program, which sees staff combine to develop new programs to enhance student learning. Annual combined school development days are held in the NS5.

In 2015 KHS became part of the City Country Alliance, which focuses on intercultural understanding. The school has had a strong link with Menindee Central School for a number of years, with regular student visits between both schools. Many students report that visiting Menindee is one of their most important experiences of their secondary school years.

Notable alumni

Academic
Ian Ramsay, law professor at Melbourne University

Entertainment and the arts
Elle Macpherson, model
Bella Ferraro, The X Factor contestant
Antonella Gambotto, author, scriptwriter and journalist
Debbie Kruger, journalist and writer
Lior, singer-songwriter
Peta Murray, playwright
Bernard Cohen, author

Sports
Mariafe Artacho del Solar, beach volleyball player, 2020 Summer Olympics silver medallist
Andrew Blades, former Wallabies prop
Nicole Laird, beach volleyball player
Anton Smirnov, chess Grandmaster, currently highest-ranked chess player in Australia

See also
List of Government schools in New South Wales

References

External links 

Killara High School Student Representative Council

Educational institutions established in 1970
Rock Eisteddfod Challenge participants
1970 establishments in Australia
Public high schools in Sydney
School buildings completed in 1970